Cun or CUN may refer to:

Education
 Central University for Nationalities, later Minzu University of China, Beijing
 Consiglio Universitario Nazionale (National University Council), Italy

People
 Bei Mafu Cun or Zhao She (趙奢), Chinese 3rd century BC official
 Cun Mula or Çun Mula[a] (1818–1896), Albanian tribal freedom fighter
 Fei Wo Si Cun (born 1978), the pen name of Chinese writer Ai Jingjing
 Yann Le Cun (born 1960), computer scientist

Places
 Cún, a village in Hungary
 Cancún International Airport (IATA code)

Other uses
 Cun (unit), a traditional Chinese unit of length
 Cun language, a Hlai language of Hainan Island
 Conn (nautical), or cun, commanding ship movements
 Villages of China (Chinese: 村, pinyin: Cūn)
 CUN the cat, official mascot of the 2018 Asia Pacific Masters Games

See also
 Con (disambiguation)